Thompson Creek is a 6.8 mile (11.0 km) 3rd order tributary to Oil Creek that rises on the Caldwell Creek divide in Crawford County, Pennsylvania.

Variant names
According to the Geographic Names Information System, it has also been known historically as: 
Thompson's Run
Thompsons Run

Course
Thompson Run rises on the Caldwell Creek divide about 0.5 miles east of Shelmadine Springs in Crawford County, Pennsylvania.  Thompson Creek then flows west to meet Oil Creek in Hydetown.

Watershed
Thompson Creek drains  of area, receives about 45.4 in/year of precipitation, has a topographic wetness index of 445.85, and has an average water temperature of 7.35 °C.  The watershed is 53% forested.

References

Additional Maps

Rivers of Pennsylvania
Rivers of Crawford County, Pennsylvania